Score voting or range voting is an electoral system for single-seat elections, in which voters give each candidate a score, the scores are added (or averaged), and the candidate with the highest total is elected. It has been described by various other names including evaluative voting, utilitarian voting, interval measure voting, the point system, ratings summation, 0-99 voting, average voting and utility voting.  It is a type of cardinal voting electoral system, and aims to implement the utilitarian social choice rule.

Score voting should be distinguished from positional voting systems, such as the Borda count: in score voting, each voter is free to give any score to any candidate; in positional voting, the score that each voter gives to each candidate is uniquely determined by the candidate's rank in the voter's ballot.

Usage

Political use 

Combined approval voting, a 3-rank form of score voting, is used to determine which candidates represent the parties in Latvia's Saeima (parliament). The number of seats for each party is determined by the Webster/Sainte-Laguë method of proportional representation.

A crude form of score voting was used in some elections in ancient Sparta, by measuring how loudly the crowd shouted for different candidates.  This has a modern-day analog of using clapometers in some television shows and the judging processes of some athletic competitions.

The Republic of Venice elected the Doge in a multi-round system, with the round that actually named the Doge being a three point score election (For, Neutral, Against). This process was used continually, with only minor changes, for over 500 years, until the republic was conquered by Napoleon.

A modern governmental example is the selection process for the Secretary-General of the United Nations, which also has a three-point scale ("Encourage," "Discourage," and "No Opinion").

Score voting is used by the Green Party of Utah to elect officers, on a 0–9 scale.

Non-political use 

Members of Wikipedia's Arbitration Committee are elected using a three-point scale ("Support", "Neutral", "Oppose").  Ballots are tallied equivalently to averaged approval voting, with "Neutral" treated as abstention, sometimes called "Explicit approval voting".

Non-governmental uses of score voting are common, such as in Likert scale customer satisfaction surveys (such as for a restaurant), automated telephone surveys (where one is asked to press or say a number to indicate their level of satisfaction or likelihood), and any mechanism that involves users rating a product or service in terms of "stars" (such as rating movies on IMDb, products at Amazon, apps in the iOS or Google Play stores, etc.). Score voting is common for processes with no single winner: for instance, some websites allow users to rate items such as movies (Internet Movie Database), comments, and recipes. The result is a ranked list of items rather than one winning item.

Sports such as gymnastics rate competitors on a numeric scale. The fact that judges' ratings are public makes them less likely to engage in blatant tactical voting.

A multi-winner variant, re-weighted score voting, is used to select five nominees for the Academy Award for Best Visual Effects using a 0–10 scale.

The traditional "highest grade point average" method of selecting a Valedictorian can be seen as a type of score election, wherein instructors "vote" on the student "candidates," with grades as their score-based votes.

Types
Score voting uses a ratings ballot; that is, each voter rates each candidate with a number within a specified score, such as 0 to 9 or 1 to 5. In the simplest system, all candidates must be rated.  The scores for each candidate are then summed, and the candidate with the highest sum is the winner.  (This is simpler for voters than cumulative voting, where they are not permitted to provide scores for more than some number of candidates.)

Some systems allow voters to explicitly abstain from rating certain candidates, as opposed to implicitly giving the lowest number of points to unrated candidates.  In this case, a candidate's score would be the average rating from voters who did rate this candidate.  However, some method must then be used to exclude candidates who received too few votes, to provide a meaningful average.

In some competitions subject to judges' scores, a truncated mean is used to remove extreme scores.  For example, score voting with truncated means is used in figure skating competitions to avoid the results of the third skater affecting the relative positions of two skaters who have already finished their performances (the independence of irrelevant alternatives), using truncation to mitigate biases of some judges who have ulterior motives to score some competitors too high or low.

Another method of counting ratings ballots is to find the median score of each candidate, and elect a candidate with the highest median score. This method is also referred to as Majority Judgment. It could have the effect of reducing the incentive to exaggerate. A potential disadvantage is that multiway exact ties for winner may become common, although a method exists in Majority Judgment to break such ties. In conventional score voting, these ties would be extremely rare. Another consequence of using medians is that adding an "all-zero ballot"
can alter the election winner, which is arguably a disadvantage.

Another proposed variant is STAR voting (Score Then Automatic Runoff). Under this system, each voter may assign a score, from 0 to the maximum score, to any number of candidates. Of the two highest-scoring candidates, the winner is the one more voters assigned a higher score. The concept was first proposed publicly in October 2014 by Center for Election Science co-founder Clay Shentrup. The runoff step was introduced in order to correct for strategic distortion in ordinary score voting, such as Bullet voting and tactical maximization.

Score voting in which only two different votes may be submitted (0 and 1, for example) is equivalent to approval voting. As with approval voting, score voters must weigh the adverse impact on their favorite candidate of ranking other candidates highly.

The term "range voting" is used to describe a more theoretical system in which voters can express any real number within the range [0, 1].  While convenient for mathematical analysis, this scale is not practical for real-world elections, and is typically approximated as a score voting system with many possible grades, such as a slider in a computer interface.

Example

Suppose that 100 voters each decided to grant from 0 to 10 points to each city such that their most liked choice got 10 points, and least liked choice got 0 points, with the intermediate choices getting an amount proportional to their relative distance.

Nashville, the capital in real life, likewise wins in the example. However, if voters from Knoxville and Chattanooga were to rate Nashville as 0 (so too for Memphis) and both sets of voters were to rate Chattanooga as 10, the winner would be Chattanooga over Nashville by 508 to 428 (and 484 for Memphis). This would be a better outcome for the voters in those cities than what they would get if they were to reflect their true preferences, and is considered to be an instance of tactical voting. Such tactical voting would be less effective if the ballots were counted using median scores (the principle behind Majority Judgment).

For comparison, note that traditional first-past-the-post would elect Memphis, even though most citizens consider it the worst choice, because 42% is larger than any other single city. Instant-runoff voting would elect the 2nd-worst choice (Knoxville), because the central candidates would be eliminated early (and Chattanooga voters preferring Knoxville above Nashville). In Approval voting, with each voter selecting their top two cities, Nashville would win because of the significant boost from Memphis residents. A two-round system would have a runoff between Memphis and Nashville where Nashville would win.

Properties
Score voting allows voters to express preferences of varying strengths.

Score voting satisfies the monotonicity criterion, i.e. raising your vote's score for a candidate can never hurt their chances of winning, and lowering it can never help their chances.  Also, score voting satisfies the participation criterion, i.e. casting a sincere vote can never result in a worse election winner (from your point of view) than if you had simply abstained from voting.

Score voting is independent of clones in the sense that if there is a set of candidates such that every voter gives the same rating to every candidate in this set, then the probability that the winner is in this set is independent of how many candidates are in the set.

In summary, score voting satisfies the monotonicity criterion, the participation criterion, the consistency criterion, independence of irrelevant alternatives, resolvability criterion, and reversal symmetry, provided voters do not have perfect information (see below; if they do have perfect information, it becomes a Condorcet method, which means it fails participation, consistency, and independence of irrelevant alternatives). It is immune to cloning, except for the obvious specific case in which a candidate with clones ties, instead of achieving a unique win. It does not satisfy either the Condorcet criterion (therefore is not a Condorcet method) or the Condorcet loser criterion, although with all-strategic voters and perfect information the Condorcet winner is a Nash equilibrium. It does not satisfy the later-no-harm criterion, meaning that giving a positive rating to a less preferred candidate can cause a more preferred candidate to lose.

It does not satisfy the majority criterion, but it satisfies a weakened form of it: a majority can force their choice to win, although they might not exercise that capability. To address this point, some proponents of score voting argue for the inclusion of an extra instant-runoff round in which a majority preference is established between the two top-rated candidates.

As it satisfies the criteria of a deterministic voting method, with non-imposition, non-dictatorship, monotonicity, and independence of irrelevant alternatives, it may appear that it violates Arrow's impossibility theorem. The reason that score voting is not a counter-example to Arrow's theorem is that it is a cardinal voting method, while the "universality" criterion of Arrow's theorem effectively restricts that result to ordinal voting methods.

Strategy

Ideal score voting strategy for well-informed voters is identical to ideal approval voting strategy, and a voter would want to give their least and most favorite candidates a minimum and a maximum score, respectively. The game-theoretical analysis shows that this claim is not fully general, even if it holds in most cases.

This leaves the tactical concern any voter has for scoring their second-favorite candidate, in the case that there are 3 or more candidates. Score too high (or anything above the minimum) and the voter harms their favorite candidate's chance to win.  Score too low and the voter helps the candidate they least desire to beat their second-favorite and perhaps win. Another strategic voting tactic is given by the weighted mean utility theorem, maximum score for all candidates preferred compared to the expected winners weighted with winning probability and minimum score for all others.

The validity of this problem is called into question by a 2009 paper which found that "experimental results support the concept of bias toward unselfish outcomes in large elections."  The authors observed what they termed ethical considerations dominating voter behavior as pivot probability decreased.  This would imply that larger elections, or those perceived as having a wider margin of victory, would result in fewer tactical voters.

Exit poll experiments have shown that voters do make use of intermediate grades and tend to vote more sincerely for candidates they perceive have no chance of winning. How voters precisely grade candidates is a topic that is not fully settled, although experiments show that their behavior depends on the grade scale, its length, and the possibility to give negative grades.

Advocates of score voting conclude that score voting may thus yield higher support for third party and independent candidates, unless those candidates become viable, than other common voting methods, and they refer to this possibility as the "nursery effect". They point out that score voting methods (including approval voting) give no reason to ever dishonestly rank a less-preferred candidate over a more-preferred one in 3-candidate elections. However, detractors respond that it provides motivation to rank a less-preferred and more-preferred candidate equally or near-equally (i.e., both 0-1 or both 98-99). This could lead to undemocratic results if different segments of the population used strategy at significantly different rates. (Note that traditional first-past-the-post voting forces all candidates except one to be ranked equally, so that all voters are compressing their preferences equally.)

Addressing these criticisms, the Equal Vote Coalition, a voting reform advocacy group, proposes a variant of score voting with an extra second round featuring the two top-rated candidates, in which the candidate with the majority of preference wins. It is claimed that the existence of a second round would discourage approval-style strategic ballots and exaggeration of ratings, making it behave like a hybrid of ranked and rated voting systems.

Advocacy

Albert Heckscher was one of the earliest proponents, advocating for a form of score voting he called the  "immanent method" in his 1892 dissertation, in which voters assign any number between -1 and +1 to each alternative, simulating their individual deliberation. This variant is also known as combined approval voting.

Currently, score voting is advocated by The Center for Election Science, Center for Range Voting, Citoyens pour le Vote de Valeur, Counted and the website RangeVote.com.  Guy Ottewell, who helped develop the method of approval voting, now endorses score voting.  Kenneth Arrow is on record as saying that "score [...] is probably the best." No elected official in the United States is known to endorse score voting.

Since 2014, the Equal Vote Coalition advocates a variant method (STAR) with an extra second evaluation step to address some of the criticisms of traditional score voting.

See also
 Borda count
Cardinal voting
 List of democracy and elections-related topics
 Consensus decision-making
 Decision making
 Democracy
 Implicit utilitarian voting
 Utilitarian social choice rule
 Hot or Not — a real-world example
 Majority judgment — similar voting method, based on medians instead of averages

Notes

External links
 The Center for Range Voting and its simplified introductory homepage
 The Center for Election Science includes an article on Score Voting
 Equal Vote Coalition, which promotes a STAR voting, a variant of score voting, in the United States
 RangeVote includes a user-friendly presentation on score voting\
 Simulation of various voting models for close elections Article by Brian Olson.
 

Electoral systems
Single-winner electoral systems
Cardinal electoral systems
Monotonic electoral systems
Utilitarianism